The Sovereign Award for Outstanding Broodmare is a  Canadian Thoroughbred horse racing honor created in 1975 by the Jockey Club of Canada. It is part of the Sovereign Awards program and is a lifetime achievement award given annually to a top broodmare in Canada.

Past winners: 
1975 : Reasonable Wife
1976 : Northern Minx
1977 : Doris White
1978 : Fanfreluche
1979 : Fit'z Fancy
1980 : Hangin Round
1981 : Native Flower
1982 : Yonnie Girl
1983 : Two Rings
1984 : Friendly Ways
1985 : No Class
1986 : Loudrangle
1987 : Arctic Vixen
1988 : Polite Lady
1989 : Passing Mood
1990 : Shy Spirit
1991 : Classy 'n Smart
1992 : Ballade
1993 : Bold Debra
1994 : Rainbow Connection

1995 : Sea Regent
1996 : Amelia Bearhart
1997 : Charming Sassafras
1998 : Fleet Courage
1999 : Sharpening Up
2000 : Primarily
2001 : Dance Smartly
2002 : First Class Gal
2003 : Radiant Ring
2004 : Annasan 
2005 : Native Rights
2006 : Dream Smartly
2007 : Lover's Talk
2008 : Kathie's Colleen
2009 : Pico Teneriffe
2010 : Destroy
2011 : Noble Strike
2012 : Misty Mission
2013 : Captivating
2014 : Eye of the Sphynx
2015 : Rare Opportunity
2016 : Galloping Ami
2017 : Victorious Ami
2018 : In Return
2019 : Loving Vindication
2020 : Danceforthecause

References
The Sovereign Awards at the Jockey Club of Canada website

Horse racing awards
Horse racing in Canada